Philippe Hardy (5 July 1954 – 1984) was a French alpine skier who competed in the 1976 Winter Olympics in the giant slalom; he placed 27th with a time of 3:40.43.

References

External links
 sports-reference.com

1954 births
1984 deaths
French male alpine skiers
Olympic alpine skiers of France
Alpine skiers at the 1976 Winter Olympics